Arto Olavi Mansala (born  1941 Kuopio) is a Finnish diplomat, a Bachelor of Political Sciences . He has been an ambassador in Budapest between 1985 and 1989, in Beijing in 1989–1992, Moscow 1993-1996 and Bonn 1996–2001. After returning home he was Counselor of Foreign Affairs at the Political Department of the Ministry for Foreign Affairs 2001–2002, Under-Secretary of State 2002–2003, Deputy Secretary of State for the Summer of 2003 and Secretary of State from the beginning of September 2003. Mansala retired in 2008.

References 

Ambassadors of Finland to China
Ambassadors of Finland to Russia
Ambassadors of Finland to Germany
Ambassadors of Finland to Hungary
1941 births
People from Kuopio
Living people